Mohammad Khalil   (Punjabi, ; born 11 November 1982) is a Pakistani former cricketer who played for the Pakistan national cricket team between 2004 and 2005. He was a left-handed batsman and a left-arm medium-pace bowler.

After only playing six first-class games, he was picked in the Test squad of Pakistani cricket team to play against Bangladesh in 2003/04. However, he could not get a chance to play in the series, later in the next season he finally made his Test debut during the first Test against Australia at the WACA Ground in December 2004, but was dropped after failing to claim a wicket. He was picked in the Pakistan ODI squad for the 2004–05 VB Series, and made his ODI debut in the 8th match of the series against Australia.

References

1982 births
Living people
Pakistan One Day International cricketers
Pakistan Test cricketers
Lahore cricketers
Pakistani cricketers
Cricketers from Lahore
Lahore Blues cricketers
Lahore Whites cricketers
Redco Pakistan Limited cricketers
Zarai Taraqiati Bank Limited cricketers
Pakistan Telecommunication Company Limited cricketers
Lahore Eagles cricketers
Punjab (Pakistan) cricketers
People from Lahore